Piergiuseppe is a masculine Italian given name. Notable people with the name include:

Piergiuseppe Maritato (born 1989), Italian footballer
Piergiuseppe Vacchelli (born 1937), Italian Roman Catholic titular archbishop

Italian masculine given names